CSB News, acronym of Chronus Satellite Broadcast was Bangladesh's first, albeit short-lived, 24-hour news & current affairs channel. It started broadcasting test transmissions from March 24, 2007 and started commercially broadcasting from April 9, 2007.

Closure
On August 23, 2007 the Ministry of Information of Bangladesh had asked the Ekushey Television (ETV) and Csb Multimedia Company Limited (CSB) to refrain from telecasting any provocative news, documentaries, talk shows and discussions against the government. On Thursday, September 6, 2007, the Bangladesh Telecommunication Regulatory Commission officially shut down transmission of the channel.

References

External links
 CSB News Official Site

24-hour television news channels
Television channels in Bangladesh
Television channels and stations established in 2007
 Television channels and stations disestablished in 2007
Defunct television channels in Bangladesh